Rhynchospira globosa is a Paleozoic articulate brachiopod of the Athyridida. It was discovered in 1857 by James Hall.

Fossils of Rhynchospira globosa can be found in North America, particularly in locations such as the Keyser Limestone, Kenneth Limestone (Indiana), New York (particularly New Scotland, Coeymans, and Becraft), and Quebec. In the Keyser Limestone, Rhynchospira globosa is commonly found within the Camarotoechia? lamellata subzone.

References

Paleozoic North America
Brachiopods